The Hohenzollern Locomotive Works (Aktiengesellschaft für Lokomotivbau Hohenzollern) was a German locomotive-building company which operated from 1872 to 1929.  The Hohenzollern works was a manufacturer of standard gauge engines and about 400 fireless locomotives as well as diesel locomotives of various rail gauges.

The company was founded on 8 June 1872 in Grafenberg near Düsseldorf. The firm produced around 4,600 locomotives. After the increasingly critical situation in the German locomotive building industry around 1929 the works was closed in November 1929. The Hohenzollern AG had hoped in vain for follow-on orders for the  DRG Class 80 from the Deutsche Reichsbahn-Gesellschaft (DRG).

Locomotive number 80 030 in the Bochum-Dahlhausen Railway Museum was one of the last that had been built by the Lokomotivbau Hohenzollern and is preserved today in photograph-grey livery. The last locomotives had left the factory in September 1929; it was then immediately torn down.

Fireless steam locomotives

Hohenzollern built a large number of fireless locomotives, including some articulated fireless locomotives with a cab at each end.  Hohenzollern's fireless locomotives were unusual in having inside cylinders.  The German for fireless steam locomotive is Dampfspeicherlokomotive, meaning steam storage locomotive.

Each locomotive had two 2-axle bogies.  On no. 1685 only one axle was powered but, on the others, two axles were powered.  For an explanation of wheel arrangements see: AAR wheel arrangement.  Nos. 1685 and 2107 (which were designed for use in mines) had air-cooled condensers to condense the exhaust steam.

Diesel locomotives

Hohenzollern supplied a  diesel-mechanical locomotive to the Russian State Railways in the 1920s.  This had a constant-mesh gearbox with an individual electromagnetic clutch to engage each gear.

Around the same time, Russian State Railways also took delivery of a  diesel-electric locomotive, class E el-2, designed in Russia by Professor Lomonosov.  Work on this locomotive was started by Hohenzollern but, for political reasons, it was later transferred to Maschinenfabrik Esslingen.

See also
 South African Class 16DA 4-6-2

References

Sources
 The Locomotive Engineers' Pocket Book 1934, (UK), publisher unknown, page 286
 The Industrial Railway Record, published by the Industrial Railway Society, ISSN 0537-5347, no. 166 (2001), page 10 and no. 170 (2002), pp 216–218

External links
 List of preserved Hohenzollern locomotives
 Photo of Hohenzollern fireless locomotive at Keilehaven Gas Works, Rotterdam
 Hohenzollern AG at www.lokhersteller.de

Defunct locomotive manufacturers of Germany
Manufacturing companies based in Düsseldorf
Transport in North Rhine-Westphalia